The 2021 Latvian Higher League , known as the Optibet Virslīga for sponsorship reasons, is the 30th season of top-tier football in Latvia. The season began on 13 March 2021 and ended 6 November 2021. RFS are the league champions and earned a place in the 2022–23 UEFA Champions League while the second, third and fourth-placed clubs earned a place in the 2022–23 UEFA Europa Conference League.

Riga were the defending champions after winning the league for a third consecutive season.

Teams
The league consists of 8 clubs from the previous season, joined by Noah Jurmala as champions of the 2020 Latvian First League. Tukums (relegated after one year in the top flight) were relegated after finishing last in the previous season and declined to apply for a license. Meanwhile, Jelgava did not receive a licence and will not take part in this year's tournament.

On 19 June 2021, Ventspils withdrew from the remainder of the season.

On 23 July 2021, Noah Jurmala withdrew from the league, remaining matches were 3–0 forfeits.

League table

Fixtures and results

Rounds 1–18

Rounds 19–36

Statistics

Top goalscorers

References

External links

Latvian Higher League seasons
1
Latvia
Latvia